Texasa chaetifrons is a species of ulidiid or picture-winged fly in the genus Texasa of the family Ulidiidae.

References

Ulidiinae